Zabrus vasconicus is a species of black coloured ground beetle in the Iberozabrus subgenus that is endemic to Spain.

Distribution
The species is found in Pais Vasco, Aralar Range and Navarra regions of Spain.

References

Beetles described in 1904
Beetles of Europe
Endemic fauna of Spain